The Bandy World Championship for women 2010 was contested between 6 bandy playing countries. The championship was played in Drammen, Norway from 24 to 27 February. Sweden defeated Russia, 3-2 following overtime, in the final game.

Participating teams

Venue

Preliminary round

Standings

Play Offs

Match for 5th place

Match for 3rd place

Final

Final standing

References
 Russian bandy federation

External links
 Bandy World Championship, Women, Drammen 2010, presented at Youtube

2010
 
2010 in Norwegian women's sport
International bandy competitions hosted by Norway
February 2010 sports events in Europe
Sport in Drammen